Kate Butters (born 25 July 1986) is a British female professional basketball player.

External links
Profile at eurobasket.com

1986 births
Living people
Sportspeople from Eastbourne
British women's basketball players
Small forwards